Cecily Rhett is a film editor and in 2007 directed a short film, Forward. She edited the 1999 film But I'm a Cheerleader, the 2001 film Stranger Inside and several episodes of the television series Biography.

Biography
Rhett received a B.A. in Russian Language and Literature from Columbia University and a master's degree in Film Production from the University of Southern California.

Filmography

Film editor
1994: Fuzzy Logic
1995: Alchemy
1998: Beyond Titanic
1999: Between Heaven and Hell: Hollywood Looks at the Bible
1999: But I'm a Cheerleader
1997–2000: Biography (TV)
2001: Stranger Inside
2007: Forward
2016: Polaris

Director
2007: Forward

References

External links

Year of birth missing (living people)
Living people
American film directors
Columbia College (New York) alumni
USC School of Cinematic Arts alumni
American film editors